Seven Seas Residence ("Republic of China Navy Command Headquarters"), also called Chihai, located in Taipei, Taiwan on Beian Street within the grounds of the ROC naval headquarters, was the official residence of Republic of China President Chiang Ching-kuo.

Name
The Residence is called Seven Seas because of the guardhouse code-named Seven Seas to recognize the contributions of the United States Seventh Fleet in protecting Taiwan during the First Taiwan Strait Crisis (1954-1955).

History
It acted as a naval reception center in the 1950s. Chiang Ching-kuo originally lived in a Japanese style home on Chang'an East Road, but moved to the Seven Seas Residence in 1968.

See also
Shilin Official Residence
Official Residence of the President (Republic of China)

References

Buildings and structures in Taipei
Presidential residences in Taiwan